Moose Run is a census-designated place (CDP) in Centre County, Pennsylvania, United States. It was first listed as a CDP prior to the 2020 census.

The CDP is in north-central Centre County, in the south part of Boggs Township. It sits in the valley of Moose Run, a south-flowing tributary of Bald Eagle Creek, part of the watershed of the West Branch Susquehanna River. U.S. Route 220 Alternate runs between Milesburg and Moose Run, with an interchange at Pennsylvania Route 144/150, which connects with Moose Run Road, the main street through the CDP.

Demographics

References 

Census-designated places in Centre County, Pennsylvania
Census-designated places in Pennsylvania